Market Street Historic District can refer to:
 Market Street Historic District (Salem, New Jersey), listed on the NRHP
 Market Street Historic District (Corning, New York), NRHP
 Market Street Historic District (Palmyra, New York), NRHP
 Market Street Historic District (Potsdam, New York), NRHP
Market Street Row, in Poughkeepsie, New York, NRHP